President Roxas may refer to:

Manuel Roxas (1892–1948), former President of the Philippines
President Roxas, Capiz, a municipality in the Philippines
President Roxas, Cotabato, a municipality in the Philippines
 President Manuel A. Roxas, Zamboanga del Norte, a municipality in the Philippines

See also
 Roxas (disambiguation)